Botelloides is a genus of sea snails, marine gastropod mollusks in the family Trochidae, the top snails.

Description
The general characteristics of the species in this genus are:
 the shell is subcylindrical and pupoid in shape
 the whorls wind obliquely on the last two-thirds of the shell
 sculpture: the earlier whorls are smooth, the later ones bear fine incised, spiral grooves
 the shape of the aperture is pyriform to circular
 the columella is excavate
 the outer lip is grooved within and bevelled to a sharp edge
Differences between the species are defined by the shell gradually widening towards the body whorl, or the shell not widening but is cylindrical.

Distribution
The species in this marine genus are endemic to Australia and occurs off New South Wales, the Northern Territory, Queensland, South Australia, Tasmania, Victoria and Western Australia.

Species
Species within the genus Botelloides include:
 Botelloides bassianus (Hedley, 1911)
 Botelloides chrysalidus (Chapman & Gabriel, 1914)
 Botelloides glomerosus (Hedley, 1907)
 Botelloides ludbrookae Ponder, 1985
 Botelloides sulcatus (Cotton, 1944)

References

 Ponder, W.F., 1985. A revision of the genus Botelloides (Mollusca: Gastropoda: Trochacea). Department of Mines and Energy, South Australia, S, 5:0-0
 Wilson, B., 1993. Australian Marine Shells. Prosobranch Gastropods. Odyssey Publishing, Kallaroo, WA

External links
 To ITIS
 To World Register of Marine Species

 
Trochidae
Gastropods of Australia